The 1930 Detroit Titans football team represented the University of Detroit in the 1930 college football season. Detroit outscored opponents by a combined total of 208 to 35 and finished with a 5–3–2 record in their sixth year under head coach and College Football Hall of Fame inductee, Gus Dorais. Significant games included a victory over West Virginia (23–0), a scoreless tie with Michigan State (0–0), and a loss to Iowa (3–7).

Schedule

References

External links
 1930 University of Detroit football programs

Detroit
Detroit Titans football seasons
Detroit Titans football
Detroit Titans football